The Order of Prince Danilo I was an order of the Principality and later Kingdom, of Montenegro. It is currently a dynastic order granted by the head of the House of Petrović-Njegoš, Crown Prince Nicholas. It is awarded to prominent champions of the preservation of Montenegrin independence and for other humanitarian, scientific, artistic and pro-social achievements as defined by statute.

Alterations were made to the appearance of the original decoration created by Prince Danilo, and during the rule of King Nikola I Petrović Njegoš the Order underwent two restructurings. During the first restructuring in 1861, three classes were introduced, while in the second restructuring, in 1873, an additional fourth class was added, so that not only is there a star in the 1st class but also a 2nd class with star was introduced. By 1922, the order consisted of five classes: Knight Grand Cross, Knight Grand Officer, Knight Commander, Officer and Cross.

Although no longer a state order, Montenegrin officials such as the President of Montenegro, Filip Vujanović, who was awarded with it, have accepted the order.

Grades

Notable recipients

Pre-abeyance
 Emperor Alexander III of Russia
 Emperor Nicholas II of Russia
 Emperor Franz Joseph I of Austria
 King Christian X of Denmark
 Queen Victoria I of the United Kingdom
 Prince Arthur, Duke of Connaught and Strathearn
 Nikola Tesla
 Ilija Garašanin
 Milutin Garašanin
 Anastas Jovanović
 Vuk Karadžić
 Sima Igumanov
 Jovan Belimarković
 Živojin Mišić
 Baron Eugen von Albori
 Georg Luger

Post-abeyance
 Princess Francine Petrović Njegoš of Montenegro (1950-2008)
 Filip Vujanović, President of Montenegro
 Albert II, Prince of Monaco
 Andrew Bertie
 Prince Dimitri Romanov
 Duarte Pio, Duke of Braganza and his wife Isabel, Duchess of Braganza
 Prince Lorenz of Belgium, Archduke of Austria-Este
 Prince Henri VII, Count of Paris
 Prince Ferdinand, Duke of Castro (1926-2008)
 Prince Carlo, Duke of Castro
 Nebojša Kaluđerović

Officers of the Order
 Grand Master (order): Crown Prince Nikola II of Montenegro
 Vice-Grand Master and Grand Chancellor: The Grand Duke of Grahovo and Zeta (2012)

References

External links
 Order of Danilo

Orders, decorations, and medals of Montenegro
Danilo I
Awards established in 1853